542 may refer to:
 542 (year)
 542 (number)
 List of highways numbered 542